Vanganel is a settlement in the City Municipality of Koper in the Littoral region of Slovenia. At the end of 2020 it had 702 inhabitants.

Geography

South of Vanganel there is a reservoir, Lake Vanganel.

Church
A small church in the settlement is dedicated to the Virgin Mary and belongs to the Parish of Marezige.

References

External links
Vanganel on Geopedia

Populated places in the City Municipality of Koper